Aksenovo is a rural locality (a village) in Krasnooktyabrskoye Rural Settlement, Gus-Khrustalny District, Vladimir Oblast, Russia. The population was 443 as of 2010. There are 4 streets.

Geography 
Aksenovo is located 40 km south of Gus-Khrustalny (the district's administrative centre) by road. Baranovo is the nearest rural locality.

References 

Rural localities in Gus-Khrustalny District
Melenkovsky Uyezd